Arbuthnot or Arbuthnott  may refer to:

Michael Arbuthnot Ashcroft, British codebreaker during WW2
Arbuthnot (surname), Scottish surname (and people with that name)
Arbuthnot (schooner), British ship during the American Revolutionary War
Arbuthnot, Saskatchewan, Canada
Arbuthnott, Scotland
Arbuthnot Lake, a lake on Mount Baker in Washington
Arbuthnot Road, Hong Kong
Arbuthnot & Co, former British bank in India during the 19th century
Arbuthnot and Ambrister incident, 1818 incident involving men tried for aiding hostile Indians in Florida, USA
Arbuthnot Latham & Co, British merchant bank
"Epistle to Dr Arbuthnot", poem by Alexander Pope addressed to  John Arbuthnot

See also
Arbuthnot (ship)
:Category: Arbuthnot family